Guitry (also spelled Guitri) is a town in southern Ivory Coast. It is a sub-prefecture of and the seat of Guitry Department in Lôh-Djiboua Region, Gôh-Djiboua District. Guitry is also a commune.

In 2014, the population of the sub-prefecture of Guitry was 147 000 .

Villages
The 19 villages of the sub-prefecture of Guitry and their population in 2014 are:

References

Sub-prefectures of Lôh-Djiboua
Communes of Lôh-Djiboua